Time Flies is the third studio album by Vaya Con Dios, who were at this point mostly a one-woman band. Even more than the previous albums, this is a melancholic album and is more blues and soul oriented. The reason for the theme is because Vaya Con Dios was mainly the partnership of Dani Klein and Dirk Schoufs and in 1991 the pair fell out badly. On 24 May 1991 Schoufs, who was only 29, died of a cocktail of medication, drugs and alcohol.

The album did very well in Europe, reaching number one in Switzerland and getting platinum certification in four countries, eventually proving to be the most successful Vaya Con Dios album.

Time Flies was the first album by Vaya Con Dios which did not end with a song in French.

Track listing

Charts

Weekly charts

Year-end charts

Certifications and sales

References

1992 albums
Vaya Con Dios (band) albums